The 1987 Ballon d'Or, given to the best football player in Europe as judged by a panel of sports journalists from UEFA member countries, was awarded to Ruud Gullit.

Rankings

Source: http://www.francefootball.fr/Ballon Or 1987

External links
 France Football Official Ballon d'Or page

1987
1987–88 in European football